The Beirut Stock Exchange (BSE, Arabic: بورصة بيروت) is the principal and only stock exchange of Lebanon. Located in Beirut, it is a public institution run by a committee including a Chairman, a Vice-Chairman and eight members appointed via a decree issued by the Council of Ministers, in accordance with a proposal by the Minister of Finance. All BSE members are Lebanese Joint stock companies (SAL) with a capital above £L500,000 and registered at the secretariat of the Commercial Register in. Members include holding companies and offshore companies. The BSE authorizes Brokerage firms the operation and trade in securities listed on the BSE according to the Bourse trading system and also lists the issuing companies (called "Listed companies") that have any of their stocks or other financial instruments listed.

History
Beirut Stock Exchange, the second oldest market in the region, was established in 1920 by a decree of the French commissioner. Trading at that time was concentrated on gold and currency transactions, however in the 1930s there was an inflow of French, Syrian and local Lebanese investment which made it possible for the BSE to flourish, especially with the establishment of mixed Lebanese-French joint stock companies that were quoted simultaneously on the Paris and Beirut Stock Exchanges. The activity in the 1950s and 1960s increased with the enlisting of various banking, industrial and services companies along with an amount of 50 listed bonds.

During the Lebanese Civil War trading activity halted in 1983. After 11 years a new administrating committee (in collaboration with the Bourse de Paris) re-launched the BSE with a new internal bylaw, re-structured and streamlined mechanisms and trading systems. A new automated brokers system was introduced, based on the fixing price instead of the traditional OTC voice brokers. On November 22, 1996, the BSE officially re-launched the trading activity in its hall. The BSE and Bourse de Paris signed a cooperation agreement in June 1999 and the new European NSC-UNIX–Euronext system was set. In 2000, new forms of securities were listed such as GDR (Global Depository Receipt), investment funds shares, preferred stocks, priority shares and any other tradable derivatives. In late 2006, the BSE launched a new Remote Trading System, allowing the brokers to trade with the securities listed on the BSE "remotely" from their own offices.
I

Hours
The exchange has pre-trading sessions from 09:00am to 09:30am and normal trading sessions from 09:30am to 12.30pm on all days of the week except Saturdays, Sundays and holidays declared by the Exchange in advance.

List 
The following companies are listed on the BSE:

See also
List of Mideast stock exchanges

Economy of Lebanon

References

External links
Beirut Stock Exchange official website

Financial services companies of Lebanon
Companies based in Beirut
Stock exchanges in the Middle East
Stock exchanges in Asia
Business in Lebanon
Economy of Lebanon
1920 establishments in Lebanon
Financial services companies established in 1920